Araschgen is a village near Chur in the Plessur district, Switzerland.  It is part of the municipality of Churwalden.

The village was first mentioned in the mid-14th century as Giraschga.  The mineral springs in the village were first mentioned in the 16th century and were rediscovered in 1863.  During the late 19th century, a mineral spa and water bottling plant were built between Araschgen and Passugg.  The Chur-Tschiertschen road was built through the village from 1887 to 1894.  In the late 20th century the village became a bedroom community of Chur.

In 2014 the village kindergarten closed due to budget concerns.  It was reopened with eight students for the 2016/17 school year to reduce crowding in Chur schools.

References

Villages in Graubünden